Kara Saun is an American fashion and costume designer and CEO of Kara Saun LLC, an LA-based fashion and costume design house. She was the costume designer on Disney Channel’s Descendants franchise.

Saun launched a teen-oriented lifestyle brand "The Fashion FairyGodmother".

Saun appeared on Season 1 of the series, Project Runway. She was the costume designer on MTV’s America's Best Dance Crew (1-5), NBC's The Sing-Off (1-3). She also designed “Make and "Jabbawockeez M.U.S.I.C.” show in Las Vegas.

References

External links 
 Official website
 

American fashion designers
American women fashion designers
Living people
African-American fashion designers
Project Runway (American series) participants
Year of birth missing (living people)
21st-century African-American people
21st-century African-American women